The United States has 129 protected areas known as national monuments. The president of the United States can establish a national monument by presidential proclamation, and the United States Congress can do so by legislation. The president's authority arises from the Antiquities Act of 1906, which allows the president to proclaim "historic landmarks, historic and prehistoric structures, and other objects of historic or scientific interest" as national monuments. Concerns about protecting mostly prehistoric Native American ruins and artifacts—collectively termed antiquities—on western federal lands prompted the legislation. Its purpose was to allow the president to quickly preserve public land without waiting for legislation to pass through an unconcerned Congress. The ultimate goal was to protect all historic and prehistoric sites on U.S. federal lands, and it has resulted in designation of a wide variety of ecological, cultural and historical sites.

President Theodore Roosevelt established the first national monument, Devils Tower in Wyoming, on September 24, 1906. He established 18 national monuments, although only nine still retain that designation. Eighteen presidents have created national monuments under the Antiquities Act since the program began; only Richard Nixon, Ronald Reagan, and George H. W. Bush did not. Bill Clinton created 19 and expanded three others. Jimmy Carter protected vast parts of Alaska, proclaiming 15 national monuments, some of which later were promoted to national parks. President Barack Obama created or expanded 34 national monuments by proclamation, the most of any president, with over half a billion acres of public land and water protected.

National monuments are located in 31 states, the District of Columbia, the Virgin Islands, American Samoa, the Minor Outlying Islands, and the Northern Mariana Islands. Arizona and California have the most national monuments, each with 18, followed by New Mexico with 13. At least seventy-four national monuments protect places of natural significance, including nineteen primarily for their geological features, eight marine sites, and eight volcanic sites (two of which are designated "National Volcanic Monuments"). At least sixty-two national monuments protect historic sites, including twenty-seven associated with Native Americans, nine relating to African American history, and eleven forts. Four have been designated World Heritage Sites. The five largest national monuments are all oceanic marine sites that protect waters and submerged lands where commercial fishing is prohibited.

Many former national monuments have been redesignated as national parks or another status by Congress, while others have been transferred to state control or disbanded.

Management by federal agencies

Eight federal agencies in five departments manage the 129 current U.S. national monuments. Of these, 115 monuments are managed by a single agency, while 14 are co-managed by two agencies. One of the NPS's national monuments, Grand Canyon-Parashant, is not an official unit because it overlaps with Lake Mead National Recreation Area. Management practices vary across agencies and sites according to their missions, the size or type of protected place, and legal authorization. Generally, hunting, fishing, and extraction of resources are prohibited.

Monuments and memorials that were not designated by the U.S. government, such as the USS Maine National Monument, are not listed here.

List of national monuments

See also
List of national parks of the United States
List of national memorials of the United States
List of areas in the United States National Park System
National Conservation Lands

References

External links

National Monument Facts and Figures – National Park Service
Maps and chronological list of all national monuments – National Park Service
Search for National Park Service areas by state – National Park Service
National Monuments and National Conservation Areas – Bureau of Land Management
National Landscape Conservation System: National Monuments – Bureau of Land Management
Other Congressionally Designated Areas  – US Forest Service
Congressionally Designated Special Management Areas in the National Forest System – Congressional Research Service
National Monuments and the Forest Service (archive)
Marine National Monuments in the Pacific – National Oceanic and Atmospheric Administration

.National Monuments
National Monuments
National Monuments Of The United States
National Monuments Of The United States